Let's Speak English was a Canadian language instruction television series which aired on CBC Television from 1961 to 1962.

Premise
This series taught English as a foreign or second language. It was hosted by Betty Fullerton, John Wevers, and as of the seventh episode, Barry Callaghan. Fullerton was a Scarborough, Ontario secondary school teacher while the other hosts were based at the University of Toronto. Michael Kay and Donald Theall from the same university served as series consultants.

Production
Let's Speak English was a co-production of the CBC, the Metropolitan Education Television Association, Canadian Scene (multicultural news agency), Ontario's provincial citizenship division, and the federal Department of Citizenship and Immigration. Peggy Nairn Liptrott produced the first four episodes, then Rena Elmer served as producer for the remainder of the series.

English language concepts were communicated with sketches and mimicry, demonstrating language use in ordinary situations.

Scheduling
This half-hour series was broadcast on three days per week, on Saturdays and Sundays at 12:00 p.m. and on Wednesdays at 11:30 a.m. between 7 October 1961 to 11 April 1962. The Wednesday episodes provided a review of material from the weekend episodes.

References

External links
 

1961 Canadian television series debuts
1962 Canadian television series endings
CBC Television original programming
English-language education